SS Deutschland was a passenger liner built in Stettin and launched in 1900 by the Hamburg America Line of Germany. The rival North German Lloyd line had launched Germany's first four funnel liner,  in 1897, and SS Deutschland was built by Hamburg America as Germany's second four-funnel liner in order to compete.

Although SS Deutschland was able to capture the Blue Riband from Kaiser Wilhelm der Grosse, crossing the Atlantic Ocean in just over five days, she suffered from persistent engine issues, and was withdrawn from transatlantic service in 1910 after just ten years. At this time she was renamed Viktoria Luise and converted to a dedicated cruise ship. As Viktoria Luise she saw brief service in World War I. Because of the bad condition of the ship after the World War, it was not seized by the Allies and was for a time the only remaining large steam ship sailing under a German flag. In 1921 she was converted again into an immigrant ship and renamed Hansa, although changes in United States immigration laws reduced the value of this trade, and ultimately she was sold for scrap in 1925.

As the transatlantic liner Deutschland

When it became clear that Kaiser Wilhelm der Grosse was a success, Hamburg America Line decided to join the battle for supremacy on the Atlantic.

Built by AG Vulcan in Stettin and launched in 1900, she won the Blue Riband from Kaiser Wilhelm der Grosse of the North German Lloyd line, crossing the Atlantic Ocean in just a little over five days. She was the first and only four-stacker built for Hamburg America.

In March 1902, she played a role in the Deutschland incident. When she was carrying Prince Henry, the brother of the Kaiser back to Europe from a highly publicized visit to the United States, the ship was prevented from using her Slaby-d'Arco system of wireless telegraphy as the Marconi radio stations refused its radio traffic through their nets and blocked the rival system. Prince Henry—who tried to send wireless messages to both the U.S. and Germany—was outraged. During a later conference, the Marconi company was forced to give access to their stations to other companies. This incident turned out to be one of the important moments in the early history of wireless transmission.

On 17 July 1906 Deutschland collided with a stone pier when departing the Port of Dover for New York, her engines having been put into forward rather than reverse. The ship's bow was damaged causing the voyage to be abandoned, with Deutschland being repaired at Southampton.

Second career as cruise ship Viktoria Luise

In 1910, Hamburg America withdrew Deutschland from transatlantic service and converted her to a dedicated cruise ship — one of the first liners of the 20th century to operate as such. Her original engines were derated as a high service speed was no longer needed. At the same time, the exterior of the ship was repainted in all white and her passenger capacity was also reduced to only 500 first-class passengers. She was also given a new name, Viktoria Luise. She replaced their first purpose-built cruise ship of similar name (Prinzessin Victoria Luise) that ran aground and was destroyed off the coast of Jamaica in 1906.

On 8 June 1914, Viktoria Luise ran aground in the Elbe and developed a list. Her engine rooms flooded. She was later refloated, repaired, and returned to service.

In World War I Viktoria Luise was converted for use as an auxiliary cruiser, but because of her still-troublesome engines, she was not used as such by the Imperial German Navy.

As the emigrant carrier Hansa

In 1921, she was pressed into emigrant carrier service and renamed Hansa. During the renaming, Hansa had two funnels removed and had some of her interiors refitted.

The United States passed the Emergency Quota Act in 1921 and the even more restrictive Immigration Act of 1924, which substantially reduced the emigrant trade from Europe. Ultimately Hansa was sold for scrap in 1925.

Gallery

References

External links

The Great Ocean Liners: Deutschland 
Lost Liners: Deutschland

Ships of the Hamburg America Line
Steamships of Germany
Cruise ships of Germany
Blue Riband holders
Four funnel liners
1900 ships
Ships built in Stettin
Auxiliary cruisers of the Imperial German Navy
Maritime incidents in June 1914